Tjaša Ristić is a Slovenian karateka. She won the silver medal in the women's kumite 61 kg event at the 2019 European Games held in Minsk, Belarus. In the final, she lost against Anita Serogina of Ukraine.

Career 

In 2015, she lost her bronze medal match, against Ana Lenard of Croatia, in the women's kumite 61 kg at the European Games held in Baku, Azerbaijan.

At the 2018 European Karate Championships held in Novi Sad, Serbia, she won one of the bronze medals in the women's kumite 61 kg event. A month later, she won the gold medal in the women's kumite 61 kg event at the 2018 Mediterranean Games held in Tarragona, Spain.

In 2021, she competed at the World Olympic Qualification Tournament held in Paris, France hoping to qualify for the 2020 Summer Olympics in Tokyo, Japan. She won her first match but she was then eliminated in her next match by Nele De Vos of Belgium.

Achievements

References

External links 
 

Living people
Year of birth missing (living people)
Place of birth missing (living people)
Slovenian female karateka
Karateka at the 2015 European Games
Karateka at the 2019 European Games
European Games medalists in karate
European Games silver medalists for Slovenia
Competitors at the 2018 Mediterranean Games
Mediterranean Games gold medalists for Slovenia
Mediterranean Games medalists in karate
21st-century Slovenian women